The Ji'an–Shuangliao Expressway, commonly referred to as the Jishuang Expressway is an expressway that connects the cities of Shuangliao, Jilin, China, and Ji'an, Jilin. The Jishuang Expressway passes through Shuangliao, Siping, Liaoyuan, and Tonghua, before finally ending in Ji'an.

This bridge, the subject of international attention, was completed in 2016, but was only opened to traffic on April 8, 2019. North Korea has plans to extend the Pyongyang-Huichon Expressway to the border at Manpo. The expressway is a spur of G11 Hegang–Dalian Expressway.

History 
In November, 2015, the section of the expressway connecting the center of Tonghua to Meihekou, a county-level city in the northwestern corner of Tonghua's administrative boundaries, was opened to traffic.

On September 28, 2019, the section of the expressway connecting the southeastern terminus of Ji'an to Tonghua, known as the Jitong Expressway, was completed.

On September 28, 2020, the section of the expressway linking the northwestern terminus of Shuangliao to Dongfeng County in Liaoyuan was completed.

Detailed Itinerary

References

Chinese national-level expressways
Expressways in Jilin